Within the United States Department of State, the Bureau of Budget and Planning (BP), previously the Bureau of Resource Management, assists agency heads with developing policies, plans, and programs to achieve foreign policy goals. The Director of Budget and Planning also coordinates resource requirements to enable the Secretary of State to present integrated International Affairs resource submissions to the Office of Management and Budget and to the US Congress.

Directors of the Bureau of Budget and Planning
The Department of State divided the Bureau of Resource Management into the Bureau of Budget and Planning and the Bureau of the Comptroller and of Global Financial Services on June 29, 2012. Directors of the Bureau of Budget and Planning are designated, not commissioned.

1. Barbara Retzlaff (2012–2015)
2. Douglas Alexander Pitkin (2015–present)

References

External links
 Official site

BP